Ophir is the name of a locality in New South Wales, Australia in Cabonne Shire.

History and discovery

Ophir is located near the Macquarie River northeast of the city of Orange.  Ophir is the place where gold was first discovered in New South Wales in 1851, leading to the Australian gold rushes. In popular literature it has been stated that William Tom Jr, John Lister and Edward Hargraves found payable gold in February 1851 at the Ophir gold diggings, located at the confluence of Summer Hill Creek and Lewis Ponds Creek . Hargraves was awarded £10,500 (worth $1,125,434 in 2004 values) by the NSW Government.

Although Hargraves was honoured and rewarded, it may have been William Tipple Smith, mineralogist, who first discovered gold at what would be later named Ophir, in 1848.  On 27 February 1852 William Tipple Smith wrote to geologist Sir Roderick Murchison in England saying the spot now called Ophir was the very spot where he had found nugget gold in 1848.   Smith's claims and correspondence are exhaustively studied in a 1986 book "A Fool's Gold?" by Lynette Ramsay Silver, in the foreword of which geology Professor David Branagan of Sydney University concurs and states "It is good to see him deservedly remembered in the pages of this book". William Tipple Smith was one of the owners of the Fitzroy Iron Works at Mittagong and, during a visit in February 1849, Governor Charles Augustus Fitz Roy was presented with a steel knife "mounted with colonial gold".

All that now remains of Ophir is very slight.  All that remains of William Tipple Smith is one small gold sample and a previously unmarked grave (number 4929, section 4, Rookwood Cemetery) that was only recently provided with a headstone recognising him as the discoverer of the first payable gold in Australia.

References

Ghost towns in New South Wales
Towns in New South Wales
Towns in the Central West (New South Wales)
Cabonne Council